Eucalyptus phaenophylla, also known as common southern mallee, is a species of mallee that is endemic to Western Australia. It has smooth bark, linear to narrow lance-shaped or narrow elliptical adult leaves, flower buds in groups of up to thirteen, pale lemon-coloured flowers and barrel-shaped, cylindrical or conical fruit.

Description
It has smooth grey to brownish bark that is shed in ribbons and sometimes accumulates near the base. Flowering occurs from January to March or from September to November and the flowers are pale lemon-yellow.

Taxonomy
Eucalyptus phaenophylla was first formally described in 1991 by Ian Brooker and Stephen Hopper in the journal Nuytsia, from material that Brooker collected from near the road between Nyabing and Pingrup in 1988. The specific epithet (phaenophylla) is from ancient Greek meaning "shining" and "-leaved".

In the same paper, Brooker and Hopper described two subspecies and the names have been accepted by the Australian Plant Census:
 Eucalyptus phaenophylla subsp. interjacens Brooker & Hopper that has a more straggly habit, larger flower buds than subspecies phaenophylla and an operculum that is about the same width as the floral cap at their join;
 Eucalyptus phaenophylla Brooker & Hopper subsp. phaenophylla.

Distribution and habitat
Common southern mallee is found on gently undulating sand plains, breakaways and ridges between Wickepin and the Ravensthorpe Range, where it grows in species-rich mallee communities.

Conservation status
This eucalypt is classified as "not threatened" in Western Australia by the Western Australian Government Department of Parks and Wildlife.

See also
List of Eucalyptus species

References

Eucalypts of Western Australia
Trees of Australia
phaenophylla
Myrtales of Australia
Plants described in 1991
Taxa named by Ian Brooker
Taxa named by Stephen Hopper